Beáta Bohus (born 25 April 1971 in Békéscsaba) is a former Hungarian handball player and handball coach. Currently she is the head coach of the Hungarian women's national youth handball team.

Playing career

Club
Bohus started to play professional handball for her hometown club Békéscsabai Előre NKSE. During her spell at the Purples, she has won a bronze medal yet in 1992. The talented line player signed to the strengthening Dunaferr in 1997 and thus become part of one of the most successful teams in the handball history. With the Dunaújváros-based team she has won the EHF Cup in 1998, the EHF Champions League in 1999 and also collected the EHF Champions Trophy in that year. In additionm she has won five Hungarian championship and as many Hungarian Cup titles. In her later years she had to compete with world-class pivot Anita Kulcsár for a first team place, and it resulted less playing minutes for her. She retired from handball in 2005, however, Hungarian second division team Csorvási SK reactivated her in 2009. She played two seasons for the club.

International
Bohus made her international debut on 30 October 1992 against France, but surprisingly she was not selected for any major tournament until 2003. That year she participated on the World Championship, where Hungary finished second. One year later she participated at the 2004 Summer Olympics, where she placed fifth with the national team. Later that year, she was also present on the European Championship and collected the bronze medal. Bohus has retired from international handball after the competition.

Coaching career
After her retirement in 2005, Békéscsaba have immediately offered her an assistant coach position. In November 2010 she was named as head coach instead of Eszter Mátéfi, in order to help the Hungarian national team coach to concentrate fully on her duties. Bohus remained in her position until October 2011, when she was replaced by Péter Kovács.
Since 2013 she is the head coach of the Hungarian women's national youth handball team.

Achievements

Player 
Nemzeti Bajnokság I:
 Winner: 1998, 1999, 2001, 2003, 2004
 Bronze Medallist: 1992, 2000
Magyar Kupa:
 Winner: 1998, 1999, 2000, 2002, 2004
EHF Champions League:
 Winner: 1999
Semifinalist: 2004, 2005
EHF Cup:
 Winner: 1998
 Finalist: 2003
EHF Champions Trophy:
 Winner: 1999
 Third Placed: 1998
World Championship:
 Silver Medallist: 2003
European Championship:
 Bronze Medallist: 2004

Coach
Hungary women's national youth handball team
IHF Women's Youth World Championship:
 Finalist: 2018
European Youth Olympic Festival:
 Winner: 2017
Youth European Championship:
 Bronze medalist: 2017

References

External links
 Beáta Bohus factsheet on Handball.hu
 Beáta Bohus player profile on the European Handball Federation Official Website

1971 births
Living people
People from Békéscsaba
Hungarian female handball players
Hungarian handball coaches
Olympic handball players of Hungary
Handball players at the 2004 Summer Olympics
Békéscsabai Előre NKSE players
Sportspeople from Békés County